Red Summer was a period in mid-1919 during which white supremacist terrorism and racial riots occurred in more than three dozen cities across the United States, and in one rural county in Arkansas. The term "Red Summer" was coined by civil rights activist and author James Weldon Johnson, who had been employed as a field secretary by the National Association for the Advancement of Colored People (NAACP) since 1916. In 1919, he organized peaceful protests against the racial violence.

In most instances, attacks consisted of white-on-black violence. Numerous African Americans fought back, notably in the Chicago and Washington, D.C. race riots, which resulted in 38 and 15 deaths respectively, along with even more injuries, and extensive property damage in Chicago. Still, the highest number of fatalities occurred in the rural area around Elaine, Arkansas, where an estimated 100–240 black people and five white people were killed—an event now known as the Elaine massacre.

The anti-black riots developed from a variety of post-World War I social tensions, generally related to the demobilization of both black and white members of the United States Armed Forces following World War I; an economic slump; and increased competition in the job and housing markets between ethnic European Americans and African Americans. The time would also be marked by labor unrest, for which certain industrialists used black people as strikebreakers, further inflaming the resentment of white workers.

The riots and killings were extensively documented by the press, which, along with the federal government, feared socialist and communist influence on the black civil rights movement of the time following the 1917 Bolshevik Revolution in Russia. They also feared foreign anarchists, who had bombed the homes and businesses of prominent figures and government leaders.

Background

Great Migration

With the mobilization of troops for World War I, and with immigration from Europe cut off, the industrial cities of the American Northeast and Midwest experienced severe labor shortages. As a result, northern manufacturers recruited throughout the South, from which an exodus of workers ensued.

By 1919, an estimated 500,000 African Americans had emigrated from the Southern United States to the industrial cities of the Northeast and Midwest in the first wave of the Great Migration (which continued until 1940). African-American workers filled new positions in expanding industries, such as the railroads, as well as many existing jobs formerly held by whites. In some cities, they were hired as strikebreakers, especially during the strikes of 1917. This increased resentment against blacks among many working-class whites, immigrants, and first-generation Americans.

Racism and Red Scare

In the summer of 1917, violent racial riots against blacks due to labor tensions broke out in East St. Louis, Illinois, and Houston, Texas. Following the war, rapid demobilization of the military without a plan for absorbing veterans into the job market, and the removal of price controls, led to unemployment and inflation that increased competition for jobs. Jobs were very difficult for African Americans to get in the South due to racism and segregation.

During the First Red Scare of 1919–20, following the 1917 Russian Revolution, anti-Bolshevik sentiment in the United States quickly followed on the anti-German sentiment arising in the war years. Many politicians and government officials, together with much of the press and the public, feared an imminent attempt to overthrow the U.S. government to create a new regime modeled on that of the Soviets. Authorities viewed with alarm African-Americans' advocacy of racial equality, labor rights, and the rights of victims of mobs to defend themselves. In a private conversation in March 1919, President Woodrow Wilson said that "the American Negro returning from abroad would be our greatest medium in conveying Bolshevism to America." Other whites expressed a wide range of opinions, some anticipating unsettled times and others seeing no signs of tension.

Early in 1919, Dr. George Edmund Haynes, an educator employed as director of Negro Economics for the U.S. Department of Labor, wrote: "The return of the Negro soldier to civil life is one of the most delicate and difficult questions confronting the Nation, north and south." One black veteran wrote a letter to the editor of the Chicago Daily News saying the returning black veterans "are now new men and world men…and their possibilities for direction, guidance, honest use, and power are limitless, only they must be instructed and led. They have awakened, but they have not yet the complete conception of what they have awakened to." W. E. B. Du Bois, an official of the NAACP and editor of its monthly magazine, saw an opportunity:By the God of Heaven, we are cowards and jackasses if now that the war is over, we do not marshal every ounce of our brain and brawn to fight a sterner, longer, more unbending battle against the forces of hell in our own land.

Events
In the autumn of 1919, following the violence-filled summer, George Edmund Haynes reported on the events as a prelude to an investigation by the U.S. Senate Committee on the Judiciary. He identified 38 separate racial riots against blacks in widely scattered cities, in which whites attacked black people. Unlike earlier racial riots against blacks in U.S. history, the 1919 events were among the first in which black people in number resisted white attacks and fought back. A. Philip Randolph, a civil rights activist and leader of the Brotherhood of Sleeping Car Porters, publicly defended the right of black people to self-defense.

In addition, Haynes reported that between January 1 and September 14, 1919, white mobs lynched at least 43 African Americans, with 16 hanged and others shot; and another 8 men were burned at the stake. The states were unwilling to interfere or prosecute such mob murders. In May, following the first serious racial incidents, W. E. B. Du Bois published his essay "Returning Soldiers":

Early riots: April 13–July 14 

April 13: In rural Georgia, the riot of Jenkins County led to 6 deaths, and the destruction of various property by arson, including the Carswell Grove Baptist Church, and 3 black Masonic lodges in Millen, Georgia.
May 10: The Charleston riot resulted in the injury of 5 white and 18 black men, along with the death of 3 others: Isaac Doctor, William Brown, and James Talbot, all black. Following the riot, the city of Charleston, South Carolina, imposed martial law. A Naval investigation found that four U.S. sailors and one civilian—all white men—initiated the riot.
Early July: A white race riot in Longview, Texas, led to the deaths of at least 4 men and destroyed the African-American housing district in the town.
July 3: Local police in Bisbee, Arizona, attacked the 10th U.S. Cavalry, an African-American unit known as the "Buffalo Soldiers" formed in 1866.

July 14: The Garfield Park riot took place in Garfield Park, Indianapolis, where multiple people, including a 7-year-old girl, were wounded when gunfire broke out.

Washington and Norfolk: July 19–23 
Beginning on July 19, Washington, D.C., had four days of mob violence against black individuals and businesses perpetrated by white men—many of whom in the military and in uniforms of all three services—in response to the rumored arrest of a black man for rape of a white woman. The men rioted, randomly beat black people on the street, and pulled others off streetcars for attacks.

When police refused to intervene, the black population fought back. The city closed saloons and theaters to discourage assemblies. Meanwhile, the four white-owned local papers, including the Washington Post, "ginned up...weeks of hysteria", fanning the violence with incendiary headlines, calling in at least one instance for a mobilization of a "clean-up" operation. After four days of police inaction, President Woodrow Wilson mobilized the National Guard to restore order. When the violence ended, a total of 15 people had died: 10 white people, including two police officers; and 5 black people. Fifty people were seriously wounded, and another 100 less severely wounded. It is one of the few times in 20th-century white-on-black riots that white fatalities outnumbered those of black people.

The NAACP sent a telegram of protest to President Woodrow Wilson:

On July 21, in Norfolk, Virginia, a white mob attacked a homecoming celebration for African-American veterans of World War I. At least 6 people were shot, and the local police called in Marines and Navy personnel to restore order.

Chicago riots: July 27–August 12 

Beginning on July 27, the Chicago race riot marked the greatest massacre of Red Summer. Chicago's beaches along Lake Michigan were segregated by custom. When Eugene Williams, a black youth, swam into an area on the South Side customarily used by whites, he was stoned and drowned. Chicago police refused to take action against the attackers, thus young black men responded with violence, lasting for 13 days, with the white mobs led by the ethnic Irish.

White mobs destroyed hundreds of mostly black homes and businesses on the South Side of Chicago. The State of Illinois called in a militia force of 7 regiments: several thousand men, to restore order. The riots resulted in casualties that included: 38 fatalities (23 blacks and 15 whites); 527 injured; and 1,000 black families left homeless. Other accounts reported 50 people were killed, with unofficial numbers and rumors reporting even more.

Mid to late August 
On August 12, at its annual convention, the Northeastern Federation of Colored Women's Clubs (NFCWC) denounced the rioting and burning of Negroes' homes, asking President Wilson "to use every means within your power to stop the rioting in Chicago and the propaganda used to incite such."

At the end of August, the NAACP protested again to the White House, noting the attack on the organization's secretary in Austin, Texas, the previous week. Their telegram read: "The National Association for the Advancement of Colored People respectfully enquires how long the Federal Government under your administration intends to tolerate anarchy in the United States?"

August 30–31, the Knoxville Riot in Tennessee started after the arrest of a black suspect on suspicion of murdering a white woman. Searching for the prisoner, a lynch mob stormed the county jail, where they liberated 16 white prisoners, including suspected murderers. The mob attacked the African-American business district, where they fought against the district's black business owners, leaving at least 7 dead and more than 20 wounded.

Omaha: September 28–29 
From September 28–29, the race riot of Omaha, Nebraska, erupted after a mob of over 10,000 ethnic whites from South Omaha attacked and burned the county courthouse to force the release of a black prisoner accused of raping a white woman. The mob lynched the suspect, Will Brown, hanging him and burning his body. The group then spread out, attacking black neighborhoods and stores on the north side, destroying property valued at more than a million dollars.

Once the mayor and governor appealed for help, the federal government sent U.S. Army troops from nearby forts, who were commanded by Major General Leonard Wood, a friend of Theodore Roosevelt, and a leading candidate for the Republican nomination for president in 1920.

Elaine massacre and Wilmington: September 30–November 
On September 30, a massacre occurred against blacks in Elaine, Phillips County, Arkansas, being distinct for having occurred in the rural South rather than a city.

The event erupted from the resistance of the white minority against the organization of labor by black sharecroppers, along with the fear of socialism. Planters opposed such efforts to organize and thus tried to disrupt their meetings in the local chapter of the Progressive Farmers and Household Union of America. In a confrontation, a white man was fatally shot and another wounded. The planters formed a militia to arrest the African-American farmers, and hundreds of whites came from the region. They acted as a mob, attacking black people over two days at random. During the riot, the mob killed an estimated 100 to 237 black people, while 5 whites also died in the violence.

Arkansas Governor Charles Hillman Brough appointed a Committee of Seven, composed of prominent local white businessmen, to investigate. The committee would conclude that the Sharecroppers' Union was a Socialist enterprise and "established for the purpose of banding negroes together for the killing of white people." The report generated such headlines as the following in the Dallas Morning News: "Negroes Seized in Arkansas Riots Confess to Widespread Plot; Planned Massacre of Whites Today." Several agents of the Justice Department's Bureau of Investigation spent a week interviewing participants, though speaking to no sharecroppers. The Bureau also reviewed documents, filing a total of nine reports stating there was no evidence of a conspiracy of the sharecroppers to murder anyone.

The local government tried 79 black people, who were all convicted by all-white juries, and 12 were sentenced to death for murder. As Arkansas and other southern states had disenfranchised most black people at the turn of the 20th century, they could not vote, run for political office, or serve on juries. The remainder of the defendants were sentenced to prison terms of up to 21 years. Appeals of the convictions of 6 of the defendants went to the U.S. Supreme Court, which reversed the verdicts due to failure of the court to provide due process. This was a precedent for heightened Federal oversight of defendants' rights in the conduct of state criminal cases.

On November 13, the Wilmington race riot was violence between white and black residents of Wilmington, Delaware.

Chronology
This list is primarily, but not exclusively, based on George Edmund Haynes's report, as summarized in the New York Times (1919).

Responses

In September 1919, in response to the Red Summer, the African Blood Brotherhood formed in northern cities to serve as an "armed resistance" movement. Protests and appeals to the federal government continued for weeks. A letter from the National Equal Rights League, dated November 25, appealed to Wilson's international advocacy for human rights: "We appeal to you to have your country undertake for its racial minority that which you forced Poland and Austria to undertake for their racial minorities."

Haynes's report
The October 1919 report by Dr. George Edmund Haynes is a call to national action, and was published in The New York Times and other major newspapers. Haynes noted that lynchings were a national problem. As President Wilson had noted in a 1918 speech: from 1889 to 1918, more than 3,000 people had been lynched; 2,472 were black men, and 50 were black women. Haynes said that states had shown themselves "unable or unwilling" to put a stop to lynchings, and seldom prosecuted the murderers. The fact that white men had also been lynched in the North, he argued, demonstrated the national nature of the overall problem: "It is idle to suppose that murder can be confined to one section of the country or to one race." He connected the lynchings to the widespread racial riots against blacks in 1919:

Lusk Committee
The Joint Legislative Committee to Investigate Seditious Activities, popularly known as the Lusk Committee, was formed in 1919 by the New York State Legislature to investigate individuals and organizations in New York State suspected of sedition. The committee was chaired by freshman State Senator Clayton R. Lusk of Cortland County, who had a background in business and conservative political values, referring to radicals as "alien enemies." Only 10% of the four-volume work constituted a report, while the rest reprinted materials seized in raids or supplied by witnesses, much of it detailing European activities, or surveyed efforts to counteract radicalism in every state, including citizenship programs and other patriotic educational activities. Other raids targeted the left-wing of the Socialist Party and the Industrial Workers of the World (IWW). When they analyzed the materials it hauled away, it made much of attempts to organize "American Negroes" and calls for revolutions in foreign-language magazines.

Press coverage
In mid-summer, in the middle of the Chicago racial violence against blacks, a federal official told The New York Times that the violence resulted from "an agitation, which involves the I.W.W., Bolshevism and the worst features of other extreme radical movements." He supported that claim with copies of Negro publications that called for alliances with leftist groups, praised the Soviet regime, and contrasted the courage of jailed Socialist Eugene V. Debs with the "school boy rhetoric" of traditional black leaders. The Times characterized the publications as "vicious and apparently well financed," mentioned "certain factions of the radical Socialist elements," and reported it all under the headline: "Reds Try to Stir Negroes to Revolt". In late 1919, Oklahoma's Daily Ardmoreite published a piece with a headline describing "Evidence Found Of Negro Society That Brought On Rioting".

In response, some black leaders such as Bishop Charles Henry Phillips of the Colored Methodist Episcopal Church asked black people to shun violence in favor of "patience" and "moral suasion." Phillips opposed propaganda favoring violence, and he noted the grounds of injustice to the black people: Phillips was based in Nashville, Tennessee.

The connection between black people and Bolshevism was widely repeated. In August 1919, The Wall Street Journal wrote: "Race riots seem to have for their genesis a Bolshevist, a Negro, and a gun." The National Security League repeated that reading of events. In presenting the Haynes report in early October, The New York Times provided a context which his report did not mention. Haynes documented violence and inaction on the state level.

The Times saw "bloodshed on a scale amounting to local insurrection" as evidence of "a new negro problem" because of "influences that are now working to drive a wedge of bitterness and hatred between the two races." Until recently, the Times said, black leaders showed "a sense of appreciation" for what whites had suffered on their behalf in fighting a civil war that "bestowed on the black man opportunities far in advance of those he had in any other part of the white man's world". Now militants were supplanting Booker T. Washington, who had "steadily argued conciliatory methods." The Times continued:

As evidence of militancy and Bolshevism, the Times named W. E. B. Du Bois and quoted his editorial in The Crisis, which he edited:

Today we raise the terrible weapon of self-defense ... When the armed lynchers gather, we too must gather armed." When the Times endorsed Haynes' call for a bi-racial conference to establish "some plan to guarantee greater protection, justice, and opportunity to Negroes that will gain the support of law-abiding citizens of both races", it endorsed discussion with "those negro leaders who are opposed to militant methods.

In mid-October government sources provided the Times with evidence of Bolshevist propaganda appealing to America's black communities. This account set Red propaganda in the black community into a broader context, since it was "paralleling the agitation that is being carried on in industrial centres of the North and West, where there are many alien laborers".  The Times described newspapers, magazines, and "so-called 'negro betterment' organizations" as the way propaganda about the "doctrines of Lenin and Trotzky" was distributed to black people. It cited quotes from such publications, which contrasted the recent violence in Chicago and Washington, D.C. with:

The Times noted a call for unionization: "Negroes must form cotton workers' unions. Southern white capitalists know that the negroes can bring the white bourbon South to its knees. So go to it." Coverage of the root causes of the riot against black people in Elaine, Arkansas evolved as the violence stretched over several days. A dispatch from Helena, Arkansas, to the New York Times datelined October 1 said: "Returning members of the [white] posse brought numerous stories and rumors, through all of which ran the belief that the rioting was due to propaganda distributed among the negroes by white men." The next day's report added detail: "Additional evidence has been obtained of the activities of propagandists among the negroes, and it is thought that a plot existed for a general uprising against the whites." A white man had been arrested and was "alleged to have been preaching social equality among the negroes". Part of the headline was: "Trouble Traced to Socialist Agitators". A few days later a Western Newspaper Union dispatch captioned a photo using the words "Captive Negro Insurrectionists."

Government activity

During the Chicago racial violence against blacks, the press learned from Department of Justice officials that the IWW and Bolsheviks were "spreading propaganda to breed race hatred". FBI agents filed reports that leftist views were winning converts in the black community. One cited the work of the NAACP "urging the colored people to insist upon equality with white people and to resort to force, if necessary. J. Edgar Hoover, at the start of his career in government, analyzed the riots for the Attorney General. He blamed the July Washington, D.C., riots on "numerous assaults committed by Negroes upon white women".  For the October events in Arkansas, he blamed "certain local agitation in a Negro lodge".  A more general cause he cited was "propaganda of a radical nature".  He charged that socialists were feeding propaganda to black-owned magazines such as The Messenger, which in turn aroused their black readers. He did not note the white perpetrators of violence, whose activities local authorities documented. As chief of the Radical Division within the U.S. Department of Justice, Hoover began an investigation of "negro activities" and targeted Marcus Garvey because he thought his newspaper Negro World preached Bolshevism. He authorized the hiring of black undercover agents to spy on black organizations and publications in Harlem.

On November 17, Attorney General A. Mitchell Palmer reported to Congress on the threat that anarchists and Bolsheviks posed to the government. More than half the report documented radicalism in the black community and the "open defiance" black leaders advocated in response to racial violence and the summer's rioting. It faulted the leadership of the black community for an "ill-governed reaction toward race rioting.… In all discussions of the recent racial riots against blacks there is reflected the note of pride that the Negro has found himself. That he has 'fought back,' that never again will he tamely submit to violence and intimidation." It described "the dangerous spirit of defiance and vengeance at work among the Negro leaders."

Arts
Claude McKay's sonnet, "If We Must Die", was prompted by the events of Red Summer.

See also
African-American veterans lynched after World War I
African Blood Brotherhood
First Red Scare
King assassination riots
List of incidents of civil unrest in the United States
Mass racial violence in the United States
Racial Equality Proposal

Notes

References

Bibliography

 - Total pages: 472

 - Total pages: 304 
  
 Dray, Philip, At the Hands of Persons Unknown: The Lynching of Black America (NY: Random House, 2002)
 
  - Total pages: 243
 - Total pages: 265 
 - Total pages: 428 
Krist, Gary. City of Scoundrels: The Twelve Days of Disaster That Gave Birth to Modern Chicago. New York, NY: Crown Publisher, 2012. .

 - Total pages: 912
 - Total pages: 328 
  - Total pages: 270
  - Total pages: 368 
 
 

 
 
 
 
 
 
 
 
 
 
 

 
 
 - Total pages: 240
 - Total pages: 930 
 Tuttle, William M., Jr., Race Riot: Chicago in the Red Summer of 1919 (Urbana: University of Illinois Press, 1996), originally published 1970
 - Total pages: 65 
 
 
 - Total pages: 386

 
Race riots in the United States
1919 in the United States
African-American history between emancipation and the civil rights movement
Anti-communism in the United States
White American riots in the United States
Presidency of Woodrow Wilson
1919 riots in the United States
Racially motivated violence against African Americans
Lynching deaths in the United States
History of racism in the United States
Riots and civil disorder in the United States
Mass murder in 1919
Red Scare